The first season of The Wonder Years aired on ABC from January 31, 1988 to April 19, 1988.

Episodes

References

1988 American television seasons
The Wonder Years seasons